East Calcutta Girls' College, established in 1992, is a women's college in Kolkata. It offers undergraduate courses in commerce, arts and sciences. It is affiliated to West Bengal State University. Until 2008, the college was affiliated to Calcutta University.

Departments

Science
Geography 
Chemistry
Physics
Mathematics 
Botany
Zoology
Computer Science

Arts

Bengali
English
Economics
History
Political Science
Philosophy
Education
Journalism
Sociology

Commerce

Accreditation
East Calcutta Girls' College is recognized by the University Grants Commission (UGC). It was accredited by the National Assessment and Accreditation Council (NAAC), and awarded B grade (March 2015 - February 2020).

See also
Education in India
List of colleges in West Bengal
Education in West Bengal

References

External links
East Calcutta Girl's College

Educational institutions established in 1992
Colleges affiliated to West Bengal State University
Women's universities and colleges in West Bengal
1992 establishments in West Bengal